The canton of Les Landes des Graves is an administrative division of the Gironde department, southwestern France. It was created at the French canton reorganisation which came into effect in March 2015. Its seat is in Salles.

It consists of the following communes:
 
Arbanats
Balizac
Le Barp
Barsac
Belin-Béliet
Budos
Cérons
Guillos
Hostens
Illats
Landiras
Louchats
Lugos
Origne
Podensac
Portets
Preignac
Pujols-sur-Ciron
Saint-Léger-de-Balson
Saint-Magne
Saint-Michel-de-Rieufret
Saint-Symphorien
Salles
Le Tuzan
Virelade

References

Cantons of Gironde